Akkamma Devi (c. 1918 – 23 November 2012) was an Indian politician and member of the Indian National Congress political party under Indira Gandhi. Devi served in the 3rd Lok Sabha for the Nilgiris from 1962 to 1967, becoming the first woman to represent that constituency.

Background
Devi was the first woman from the Nilgiris to graduate from college. Akkamma Devi served in the national Lok Sabha representing the Nilgiris constituency from 1962 to 1967, the first woman to hold that seat. She was chosen to run for the seat by Chief Minister of Madras (now known as Tamil Nadu) K. Kamaraj. Devi died at her home in hubbathalai, Tamil Nadu, India, from a long illness on 23 November 2012, at the age of 94.

References

2012 deaths
India MPs 1962–1967
Lok Sabha members from Tamil Nadu
Women in Tamil Nadu politics
Indian National Congress politicians from Tamil Nadu
People from Nilgiris district
1910s births
20th-century Indian women politicians
20th-century Indian politicians
Adivasi politicians
Adivasi women